Shaju Khadem is a Bangladeshi actor and comedian whose work is predominant in television.

He has starred in popular dramas like “Doll's House”, “Gohine”, “Poush Faguner Pala”, “Besto Doctor” and “Alok Nagar”.
He has featured in many other popular one-hour-dramas. He was an art director for Banglavision.

Career
Shaju Khadem started his career in 1997 by stage dramas. Later in 1999, he got the leading role in silent comedy serial Bholar Diary on ETV. Then, he planned and directed a popular show titled “Raat Biraate”.
The actor made his film debut in the movie Common Gender, playing the role of a hermaphrodite or Hijra.
He has acted in numerous television dramas like  “Kobiraj Golap Shah”, “Oloshpur”, “Poush Faguner Pala”, “Chor Kabyo” and “Gronthikgon Kohe”, “Ponchom” by Omlan Bishwash, “Mombasa” by Shihab Shaheen and two more dramas titled “Iti Dulabhai” and “Facebook”. Mozeza Ashraf Monalisa made her debut with the drama "Chupichupi" opposite Shaju.

Personal life

Shaju is married to actress Protitee Haque, she is the sister of actress Hridi Haque and sister-in-law of actor Litu Anam.

Films
Common Gender (2012) as Sushmita/ Sushmoy

• Purno Doirgho Prem Kahini

Television
 Mehman (2021)

References

Bangladeshi male film actors
Bangladeshi male stage actors
Bangladeshi male television actors
Year of birth missing (living people)
Living people